Message from a Drum is the third album by Native American rock band Redbone released in 1971. It was released in Europe under the name The Witch Queen of New Orleans with the same track list and a different cover. The CD version released in the early 2000s has the European cover and title of the original LP and includes the single version of "Chant: 13th Hour" as a bonus track (the full version being from the second LP Potlatch).

Track listing

Side one
"Message from a Drum" (Patrick Vegas) – 3:08
"Niji Trance" (R. A. Bellamy/Patrick Vegas/Lolly Vegas) – 3:27
"The Sun Never Shines on the Lonely" (Lolly Vegas) – 2:35
"Maxsplivitz (instrumental)" (Lolly Vegas) – 0:18
"Emotions" (Lolly Vegas) - 4:10
"Jerico" (Lolly Vegas/Patrick Vegas) - 3:47

Side two
"The Witch Queen of New Orleans" (Patrick Vegas/Lolly Vegas) – 2:45
"When You Got Trouble" (Patrick Vegas/Lolly Vegas) – 3:24
"Perico (instrumental)" (Lolly Vegas) – 0:18
"Fate" (Lolly Vegas) – 6:36
"One Monkey" (Lolly Vegas) - 4:09

Personnel
 Lolly Vegas – lead guitar, organ, acoustic guitar, vocals
 Tony Bellamy – rhythm guitar, Wah-Wah, dobro, vocals
 Pat Vegas – bass, acoustic guitar, electric guitar, piano, vocals
 Peter DePoe – drums, percussion, vocals

Charts

References

1971 albums
Redbone (band) albums
Epic Records albums